Cavariella konoi is a species of aphid in the family Aphididae. The body is oval, pale yellowish green, sometimes with a pair of darker green, longitudinal bands. Wingless females are found on the leaves of willow Salix spp. during the summer where they reproduce parthenogenetically and form large populations. It also feeds on the perennial plant great angelica (Angelica atropurpurea).

This species has a holarctic distribution.

References

Macrosiphini
Insects described in 1939
Hemiptera of Asia
Hemiptera of Europe